Mark Rendell  (born 6 June 1969) is a cyclist from New Zealand.

Career
In 1993 during the third stage at the Milk race Rendall was in a breakaway which made it to the finish line where he was beaten by Matt Postle by a slim margin of two seconds.
At the 1994 Commonwealth Games at Victoria he won a gold medal in the road race and a bronze medal in the team time trial. Until the 2022 Commonwealth Games Rendall was the last kiwi to earn a gold medal in road cycling at the games. As a former student of Rotorua Boys' High School after Rendall won his gold medal he was inducted into the Rotorua Boys' hall of fame.

Major results
Sources
1994
 1st  Commonwealth Games road race
 1st Stage 10 Colonial Classic
1996
 10th Overall Tour de Langkawi

References

External links
 

Living people
Commonwealth Games gold medallists for New Zealand
Commonwealth Games bronze medallists for New Zealand
Cyclists at the 1994 Commonwealth Games
New Zealand male cyclists
Place of birth missing (living people)
Commonwealth Games medallists in cycling
20th-century New Zealand people
1969 births
Medallists at the 1994 Commonwealth Games